The Union of Orthodox Hebrew Congregations is an umbrella organisation of Haredi Jewish communities in London, and has an estimated membership of over 6,000. It was founded in 1926, with the stated mission "to protect traditional Judaism", and has an affiliation of over a hundred synagogues and educational institutions. It caters for all aspects of Haredi Jewish life in London, and operates mainly in the suburbs of Stamford Hill, Golders Green, Hendon, and Edgware.

Activities
The Kedassia kashruth organisation
UOHC is responsible for the management of the Beis Brucha Mother & Baby Home, which provides short-term care for mothers and new-born babies after childbirth.
North London Chevra Kadisha
North West London Chevra Kadisha
Beth Din for litigation in Stamford Hill and Golders Green
Beis Horo'o (advice centre for questions of Jewish Law)

Rabbinate
The spiritual leadership of UOHC is in the hands of its rabbinate, led by the Av Beis Din. Its first head was Rabbi Avigdor Schonfeld. He was succeeded by his son, Solomon Schonfeld, who also founded the Jewish Secondary School Movement.

From 1955 to 2000, the Av Beis Din was the posek, Rabbi Chanoch Dov Padwa. He was succeeded in 2000 by the present incumbent, his son, Rabbi Ephraim Padwa. In addition to the Av Beis Din, the following people serve as members of the rabbinate: Rabbi Sholom Friedman, Rabbi Zev Feldman, Rabbi Shlomo Freshwater, Rabbi Yisroel Meir Greenberg, Rabbi Aharon Dovid Dünner, and Rabbi Joseph Padwa. Members of the rabbinate are often styled "Dayan".

The Rosh Beis Din was Rabbi Josef Hirsch Dunner until his death in 2007. Josef Dunner named his son, Rabbi Ahron Dovid Dünner, as his desired successor to the post.
The executive committee of UOHC, however, resolved to discontinue the title of Rosh Beis Din, leaving Rabbi Ephraim Padwa as the sole rabbinical head of the UOHC.

Lay management
The lay management is its executive committee, elected triennially by the UOHC, whose members are appointed by the constituent synagogues.

Controversies

Free Leah
In January 2023 Leah a Agunah died while still being chained to her ex husband, the UOHC refused to issue a Siruv because 1: He would be unable to go to Shul 2: He wouldn't listen anyway.

Neturei Karta funding controversy
In July 2006, The Jewish Chronicle wrote that the UOHC's accounts appeared to show it had given a London-based charity associated with Neturei Karta more than £58,000 in grants. This prompted some members of the Hendon Adath Yisroel Synagogue to review its affiliation with the UOHC. The synagogue resolved to remain affiliated.

Sexual abuse scandal
 
In October 2012, a blog post appeared on the blog If You Tickle Us which suggested that Chaim Halpern, rabbi of a UOHC synagogue and a member of the UOHC rabbinate, was accused of inappropriate sexual conduct. It later became clear that the accusation was of sexual impropriety with around thirty women that came to him for counselling. A group of London rabbis and religious judges issued a statement stating that the rabbi was "not fit and proper to act in any rabbinic capacity", a decision reached after "extensive investigations, including interviews with alleged victims", and the rabbi was forced to resign from all public positions, including his position on the Beth Din.

After accusations of attempting a whitewash, and a growing fear among the UOHC that Golders Green synagogues would secede from the union in protest at its handling of the case, the union expelled the rabbi's synagogue from the union. However, the union later retracted its expulsion, saying it was the result of a  "misunderstanding". One synagogue left the union because its "lack of willingness or ability" to deal with the issue was "a matter of great embarrassment". The saga exposed deep divisions between the Haredim in Golders Green, whose local rabbis attempted to remove the rabbi from all positions of authority, and those in Stamford Hill, whose Jewish community is predominantly Hasidic.

Position on child abuse
In 2013, a Channel 4 exposé secretly filmed the head of the UOHC, Ephraim Padwa, instructing a person claiming to have been sexually abused as a child not to go to the police, as it would violate the prohibition of mesirah. Subsequently, a spokesman for Padwa doubted the credibility of the alleged victim, claiming the allegations had already been dismissed by social services as "malicious". The Union denied claims that it did not deal with such allegations seriously, and on the eve of the broadcast of the Dispatches episode, it announced the establishment of a child protection committee.

References

Jewish community organizations
Jewish religious organizations
Orthodox Judaism in London
Haredi Judaism in the United Kingdom
Judaism and sexuality